Samuel Barnes may refer to:

 Samuel Barnes, one half of the Trackmasters and a rapper known also as Red Hot Lover Tone
 Samuel Barnes (Australian politician) (1865–1951), member of the Victorian Parliament
 Samuel A. Barnes (1876–1941), former member of the Legislative Assembly of Alberta
 Samuel H. Barnes (1808–1860), American politician from New York
 Sam Barnes (1899–1981), American baseball player
 Sam Barnes (footballer) (born 1991), English footballer